The Gundlach-Grosse House is a historic house located at 625 N. Main St. in Columbia, Illinois. The Greek Revival house was built in 1857 for German immigrants John and Philip Peter Gundlach. The brothers ran a local brewery which remained in their family for four generations, and John Gundlach served as Columbia's mayor for four years. The house is a 1 ½-story brick building; its corbeled brick frieze is representative of the decorative brickwork commonly designed by German immigrant builders. The entrance to the house features a classical pediment supported by Ionic columns and cast iron pilasters. Two windows with broken scroll pedimented lintels are situated on each side of the door. The house's gable roof features three gabled dormers on the front and back sides.

The house was added to the National Register of Historic Places on December 18, 1978.

References

Houses on the National Register of Historic Places in Illinois
Greek Revival houses in Illinois
Houses completed in 1857
Houses in Monroe County, Illinois
National Register of Historic Places in Monroe County, Illinois
1857 establishments in Illinois